Amir Bux Shar was a notable Sindhi-language poet and writer of Pakistan. In addition to his writing, he was also a social worker. He was a dedicated leftist throughout his entire life. Being born in a family living under a wrenched hut, he proved himself as one of the most educated man in that society and later on, throughout Sindh. Amir used to write in various newspapers in his adulthood and continued this practice till his last breath. His autobiographies Rae Per Rat Kaya(رائي پيرَ رت ڪيا) and Chipon Per Chinan(ڇپون پيرَ ڇنن) are one of the notable works in Sindhi literature. Along with these two his work on Kahlora Rule in Sindh was a masterpiece in their history. Shar translated Documents which he got from Mian Gul Muhammad Kalhore, the successor of Kalhora Hukumrans, living in Mirpurkhas.

References

2017 deaths
Sindhi-language poets
Sindhi-language writers
Sindhi people
1960 births